Wanniarachchige Senali Koshila Fonseka (born 18 September 1992), popularly known as Senali Fonseka, is an actress in Sri Lankan cinema, theatre and television. Her first appeared film was Siri Parakum as Sirimal Ethana. Senali became more popular with her role as Paatali "Sudu Chooti" in Sri Lankan television series Nadagamkarayo.

Personal life 
Senali Koshila Fonseka was born on 18 September 1992 in Colombo, Sri Lanka. Her father Upali Fonseka was one of the brothers of Sri Lankan famous actress Malini Fonseka, who known as Queen of Sinhalese cinema. She attended with Visakha Vidyalaya, Colombo, Sri Lanka and then her family moved to England and she got her higher education from University of Cambridge in Biomedical Sciences.

In 2020 Senali's father died due to the effect of COVID-19 in England.

Career 
In 2013 Senali began her acting career in Sri Parakum as the role of Sirimal Ethana, directed by Somaratne Dissanayake. The film became the highest-grossing film in Sri Lankan cinema history. She made her first television appearance in "Sellam Gedara", telecasted on ITN, Sri Lanka. Later in 2014 she was taken into the TV Mini Series "Kalu Sewanella".

In 2018 she acted "Doowili Ahasa" television series telecasted on Sri Lanka Rupavahini Corporation. In the year 2021 she was more popular with the role of "Paatali" alias "Sudu Chooti" in Sri Lankan famous television series, Nadagamkarayo. She became known through the role of "Paatali" and later was awarded Most Popular Teledrama Actress in Sumathi Awards in 2021. She has received acclaim from critics and audiences for the acting performances in Nadagamkarayo teledrama.

Television serials

Filmography

References

External links 

Sri Lankan film actresses
Sri Lankan television actresses
1992 births
Living people
Sri Lankan stage actresses